Tomaž Globočnik (born 17 April 1972) is a Slovenian biathlete. He competed at the 1998 Winter Olympics and the 2002 Winter Olympics.

References

1972 births
Living people
Slovenian male biathletes
Olympic biathletes of Slovenia
Biathletes at the 1998 Winter Olympics
Biathletes at the 2002 Winter Olympics
People from Škofja Loka